Lamellidea is a genus of air-breathing tropical land snails, terrestrial pulmonate gastropod mollusks in the family Achatinellidae.

Species
Species within the genus Lamellidea include:
 Lamellidea biplicata
 Lamellidea microstoma
 Lamellidea monodonta
 Lamellidea nakadai
 Lamellidea ogasawarana
 Lamellidea subcylindrica

References

 Nomenclator Zoologicus info

 
Achatinellidae
Taxonomy articles created by Polbot